Foxman is a surname. Notable people with the surname include:

Abraham Foxman (born 1940), American lawyer and activist
Betsy Foxman (born 1955), American epidemiologist

See also
Fox spirit, a mythical fox entity that is a common motif in East Asian mythology